Axén is a surname. Notable people with the surname include:

Alexander Axén (born 1970), Swedish football manager
Gunilla Axén (born 1966), Swedish footballer
Gunnar Axén (born 1967), Swedish politician
Kristina Axén Olin (born 1962), Swedish politician